On the morning of Thursday, 7 April 2011, a World Health Day, 12 children aged between 12 and 14 were killed and 22 others seriously wounded by Wellington Menezes de Oliveira, who entered the Tasso da Silveira Municipal School (Escola Municipal Tasso da Silveira), an elementary school in Realengo on the western fringe of Rio de Janeiro, Brazil. It was the first non-gang school shooting with a sizable number of casualties reported in Brazil.

Although police found no concrete evidence of religious or political motives, texts found at Oliveira's home suggest that he was obsessed with terrorist acts and Islam, which he had converted to two years beforehand, after having been a Jehovah's Witness. In his last wishes, he requested to be buried following Islamic traditions, and asked Jesus for eternal life and "God's forgiveness for what I have done."

Shooting
A lone gunman, Wellington Oliveira, entered the Tasso da Silveira at around 08:30 local time, identifying himself as a former student and asking to see his school history; as such, he was allowed to enter, but instead of heading to the school's office he proceeded to the second floor and entered an eighth-grade classroom. Some of the victim's accounts say that he was initially very polite, greeting the children and putting his bag on a table, but soon after shot several pupils. The perpetrator was armed with a .38-caliber revolver and a .32-caliber revolver with a number of speedloaders. A boy who survived the attack said that Oliveira selectively shot to kill girls while shooting boys only to immobilize them. Ten of the twelve children killed were girls.

The children ran out of the Tasso da Silveira as soon as Oliveira started shooting. Two policemen who were patrolling the area were alerted to the shooting by two boys who had been wounded in the face. As the policemen arrived at the school, the gunman had already left the classroom and was preparing to proceed to the third floor where students and teachers had barricaded themselves inside the remaining classrooms. Rio de Janeiro military policeman Third Sergeant Márcio Alexandre Alves shot the gunman in the leg and in the stomach; he fell down a staircase and then shot himself fatally in the head.

The victims were between 12 and 14 years old. 11 of the 12 students were buried the day after the shooting, following the Brazilian practice of burying (or cremating) people within a day of their death. The twelfth child's body was cremated two days after the shooting.

Perpetrator
Wellington Menezes de Oliveira (13 July 1987 – 7 April 2011), a 23-year-old former pupil of the school, was identified as the gunman. Police confirmed they had a letter stating the perpetrator's intention to commit suicide. The police stressed that they found no concrete evidence of a religious or political motive for the attack. Texts found at Oliveira's home suggest that he was obsessed with terrorist acts and Islam which he described as the most correct religion. A neighbor said Oliveira had turned to Islam two years beforehand after being a lifelong Jehovah's Witness. In his letters, Oliveira states that he attended the mosque in downtown Rio and that he would study the Qur'an for four hours daily. He also describes his association with "Abdul", who came from overseas and who boasted about having taken part in the September 11 attacks. He also indicated his desire to move to a Muslim majority country, either Egypt or Malaysia. However, Islamic leaders in Rio denied Oliveira's claims.

Oliveira attended the Tasso da Silveira Municipal School from 1999 to 2002. According to former schoolmates he was a strange, very reserved person constantly harassed by others, was called "Sherman" (an allusion to a character from American Pie), as well as "suingue" (swing), because he had a limp leg, and was thrown into a garbage bin. In a video he had recorded two days prior to the shooting Oliveira stated: "The struggle for which many brothers died in the past, and for which I will die, is not solely because of what is known as "bullying" [the English word]. Our fight is against cruel people, cowards, who take advantage of the kindness, the weakness of people unable to defend themselves." 

Pictures taken by Oliveira show him standing in positions similar to that of Seung-Hui Cho, including him pointing the firearms used in the shooting at himself and the camera, although this was not confirmed.

In his last wishes, he wished to be buried following Islamic traditions, and asked Jesus for eternal life and "God's forgiveness for what I have done". As none of his relatives claimed Oliveira's body, it was buried in a potter's field at the Caju Cemetery two weeks after his death.

Victims
The list of victims was released by police in Rio de Janeiro. The families of four victims decided to donate the victims' organs. Six injured children, two of them in critical condition, required further treatment.

The victims were:

Investigation
The police estimate that over 60 shots were fired by the perpetrator during the shooting. His body was found with a .38 caliber and a .32 caliber revolver, some speedloaders and a bandolier with 18 unused rounds.

 The .32-caliber Taurus Model 73 snubnosed revolver belonged to a man who died in 1994 and according to his son, it was stolen from him by the time of his death. The police apprehended the two men who illegally sold the weapon to the perpetrator, who, according to them, claimed he needed the firearm for his own protection.
 Despite the fact that the .38-caliber Rossi Model 971 revolver had its serial number almost totally scratched-off, the Police managed to locate the weapon's original owner, a 57-year-old man who worked in a slaughterhouse and was a former co-worker of the perpetrator. According to the seller he sold Wellington the weapon, the speedloaders, and a huge quantity of ammunition, possibly that used in the shooting.

National response

President Dilma Rousseff declared three days of national mourning and shed tears during her speech to the public regarding the incident.

The State Governor, Sérgio Cabral, and the Mayor of Rio de Janeiro, Eduardo Paes, addressed the press at the site of the shooting a few hours later. Cabral described the sergeant, teachers and children from the elementary school, who were able to call policemen who were nearby, as "heroes". "Without them, the tragedy would have been much worse", he said.

The incident sparked nationwide discussions about how safe Brazilian schools are, and the government promised to advance a disarmament program from 6 May 2011, until the end of the year.

On 9 April 2011, the house where Wellington de Oliveira had lived had  a graffiti inscription "assassino covarde" (cowardly murderer). Two days later, a group of local people and former students of the school repainted the house, saying that people "should not continue the harm that he has caused".

Hundreds of residents and students from other schools gathered outside the school in memory of the dead. Posters and flowers were left in front of the school.

On 10 April, a group of protesters hung blood-stained Brazilian flags on Copacabana beach in memory of the children killed.

At the end of a concert in São Paulo, singer Bono, from Irish band U2, asked almost 80 thousand people to remember the children who died in Realengo while their names scrolled up on a screen.

The three policemen who responded to the shooting were decorated for bravery by Brazilian vice-president Michel Temer on 12 April 2011. Third Sergeant Márcio Alexandre Alves was promoted to Second Sergeant; Corporals Denilson Francisco de Paula and Ednei Feliciano da Silva were promoted to Third Sergeant.

International response
The international press commented that Brazilian public opinion was shocked by the shooting as it was the first of its kind in the country.

The archbishop of Rio de Janeiro, Orani João Tempesta, received a letter from Pope Benedict XVI, who said that he prayed for the quick recovery of the wounded and asked all people of the city to "help build a society with no violence, and respect for each other, especially for the weak and oppressed".

Students from Columbine, Colorado, US, the site of a 1999 massacre, made a poster stating their feelings about the tragedy. The poster was sent to the Brazilian elementary school.

After the Sandy Hook Elementary School shooting by a former primary pupil, in Newtown, Connecticut, US on 14 December 2012, the Tasso da Silveira school held a vigil for the victims on 21 December.

See also
 List of massacres in Brazil
 List of rampage killers (school massacres)

References

External links

 The Rio de Janeiro School Massacre - slideshow by Life magazine

2010s in Rio de Janeiro
April 2011 crimes
April 2011 events in South America
Deaths by firearm in Brazil
Mass shootings in Brazil
Massacres in Brazil
Massacres of women
Murder–suicides in Brazil
School shootings in Brazil
2011 suicides
Suicides by firearm in Brazil
Violence against women in Brazil
2011 murders in Brazil
2011 mass shootings in South America
Attacks in Brazil
Attacks in South America in 2011
Mass murder in 2011